The raphe nuclei ("seam") are a moderate-size cluster of nuclei found in the brain stem. They have 5-HT1 receptors which are coupled with Gi/Go-protein-inhibiting adenyl cyclase. They function as autoreceptors in the brain and decrease the release of serotonin. The anxiolytic drug Buspirone acts as partial agonist against these receptors. Selective serotonin reuptake inhibitor (SSRI) antidepressants are believed to act in these nuclei, as well as at their targets.

Anatomy 
The raphe nuclei are traditionally considered to be the medial portion of the reticular formation, and
appear as a ridge of cells in the center and most medial portion of the brain stem.

In order from caudal to rostral, the raphe nuclei are known as the nucleus raphe obscurus, the nucleus raphe pallidus, the nucleus raphe magnus, the nucleus raphe pontis, the median raphe nucleus, dorsal raphe nucleus, caudal linear nucleus. In the first systematic examination of the raphe nuclei, Taber et al.. (1960) originally proposed the existence of two linear nuclei (nucleus linearis intermedius and nucleus linearis rostralis). This study was published before techniques enabling the visualization of serotonin or the enzymes participating in its synthesis had been developed, as first demonstrated by Dahlström and Fuxe in 1964. Later, it was revealed that of these two nuclei, only the former (nucleus linearis intermedius, now known as the caudal linear nucleus), proved to contain serotonin-producing neurons, though both of them contain dopaminergic neurons.

In some works (e.g.), researchers have grouped the nuclei lineares into one nucleus, the nucleus linearis, shrinking the number of raphe to seven, e.g.,
NeuroNames makes the following ordering:
 Raphe nuclei of medulla oblongata
 Nucleus raphe obscurus
 Nucleus raphe magnus
 Nucleus pallidus
 Raphe nuclei of the pontine reticular formation
 Nucleus raphe pontis
 Nucleus centralis inferior
 Raphe nuclei of the midbrain reticular formation
 Nucleus centralis superior (median raphe nucleus)
 Nucleus raphe dorsalis

Nomenclature
The Latin names commonly used for most of these nuclei are grammatically and orthographically incorrect. Latin grammar would require to use the genitive case raphes ('of the seam') instead of the nominative case raphe ('seam') in these Latin expressions. The main authority in anatomical names, Terminologia Anatomica uses for example nucleus raphes magnus instead of the grammatically incorrect nucleus raphe magnus. The spelling raphe/raphes however can also be contested as numerous sources indicate that raphe is an incorrect Latin rendering of the Ancient Greek word ῥαφή as the initial letter rho with rough breathing (spiritus asper) is normally rendered as rh in Latin. The edition of the Nomina Anatomica that was ratified in Jena in 1935 used rhaphe instead of raphe.

Projections
These nuclei interact with almost every pertinent portion of the brain, but only a few of them have specifically independent interaction. These select nuclei are discussed as follows.

Overall, the caudal raphe nuclei, including the nucleus raphe magnus, nucleus raphe pallidus and nucleus raphe obscurus, all project towards the spinal cord and brain stem. The more-rostral nuclei, including the nucleus raphe pontis, nucleus centralis superior (also called median raphe nucleus) and nucleus raphe dorsalis project towards the brain areas of higher function

However, studies also show that numerous areas of the brain control the serotonergic neurons located in the nucleus raphe dorsalis, including the orbital cortex, cingulate cortex, medial preoptic area, lateral preoptic area, and several areas of the hypothalamus. The connection between these areas, particularly between the nucleus raphe dorsalis and the orbital cortices, is thought to have influences on depression and obsessive compulsive disorder prognosis.

Function 
The raphe nuclei have a vast impact upon the central nervous system.
Many of the neurons in the nuclei (but not the majority) are serotonergic; i.e., contain serotonin, a type of monoamine neurotransmitter and are modulated through fibrous pathways in the midbrain.

Projections from the raphe nuclei also terminate in the dorsal horn of spinal gray matter where they regulate the release of enkephalins, which inhibit pain sensation.

The raphe nuclei provide feedback to the suprachiasmatic nuclei (SCN), thus contributing in circadian rhythms in animals. The SCN transmits to the raphe nuclei via the dorsomedial hypothalamic nucleus altering serotonin levels for sleep/wake states. The raphe nuclei will then transmit feedback to the SCN about the animal's vigilance and levels of alertness. This reciprocal feedback between the two structures provides an adaptable yet stable basis of circadian rhythms.

Thermoregulation 

A large increase in sympathetic nerve activity was observed when an excitatory amino acid was injected into the Raphe Pallidus , resulting in both BAT temperature and HR increasing. This suggests that activation of the raphe nucleus results in an increase in sympathetic activity to the BAT.

The raphe pallidus wasn't switched off using 8-OH-DPAT, which in turn reduced body temperature due to a reduced response to cold. This suggests the importance of the raphe nucleus in responding appropriately to the cold.

The raphe nuclei and the effects of ghrelin
More recent studies of the Raphe Nuclei done with rats involve the effects of ghrelin on the dorsal raphe nucleus. When administered, larger doses of ghrelin act centrally on the raphe nucleus, hippocampus, and amygdala which causes dramatic increases in food intake, memory retention, and increases in anxiety. The effects of ghrelin are seen on the raphe nucleus as soon as an hour after injection, suggesting rapid changes in the structure of the nucleus. Changes also occur after 24 hours suggesting delayed modifications as well.

See also 
 Locus ceruleus
 Substantia nigra
 Pedunculopontine nucleus
 List of regions in the human brain

References

Further reading 

 
 
 

Brainstem nuclei
Serotonin